Paraplagioporus is a genus of trematodes in the family Opecoelidae.

Species
Paraplagioporus isagi Yamaguti, 1939
Paraplagioporus madrasensis Salman & Srivastava, 1990

References

Opecoelidae
Plagiorchiida genera